Gŵyl Fwyd Llanbed - Lampeter Food Fest (previously known as Ffair Fwyd Llanbed - Lampeter Food Festiva) is an annual food festival held at Lampeter in Ceredigion.

Overview

Lampeter Food Festival is held in the grounds of the University of Wales Trinity St David at Lampeter, usually in July.

The festival attracts around 100 stalls selling food and drink and is a key local event. There are live cookery demonstrations by chefs, as well as cook-offs and culinary crafts.

Focus

Although the festival focuses mainly on food and drink it also highlights the many crafts available in the area. In addition, reflecting the association with the University, there are stands from charities and educational organisations.

There is also music and other forms of entertainment. The festival also reflects the influence of alternative lifestyles associated with Ceredigion.

Structure

The festival was established by Lampeter Chamber of Trade and thereafter was run as a private company limited by guarantee with the support of volunteers, Lampeter Round Table and local businesses. 

In May 2019, a new committee took over the running of the festival, supported by Lampeter Town Council, Lampeter Chamber of Trade and the University of Wales Trinity St. David and the festival was re-named Gŵyl Fwyd Llanbed - Lampeter Food Fest.

Location

The festival is hosted by the University of Wales Trinity St Davids in their college grounds.

Financial support

The festival has received financial support from Lampeter Town Council, Ceredigion County Council and Welsh Government.

Further reading

Business Wales, Food and Drink

About Wales, Welsh Food Festivals

Videos

 Lampeter Food Festival 2015
 Lampeter Food Festival 2018

See also 
Lampeter
Ceredigion 
Cuisine of Ceredigion.

References 

Food and drink festivals in the United Kingdom
Ceredigion
Annual events in Wales
1997 establishments in Wales
Recurring events established in 1997
Summer events in Wales